Always Room for One More is a children's picture book written by Sorche Nic Leodhas with illustrations by Nonny Hogrogian.  Published by Henry Holt and Company, it won the Caldecott Medal for excellence in American children's literature illustration in 1966. It tells the tale of Lachie MacLachlan, a generous Scottish man. While he lives in a small hut with his wife and ten children, he always welcomes in any weary traveler who walks by on a stormy night.

Inspiration for the book
This story is based on an old Scottish folk song.

References

1965 children's books
American picture books
Caldecott Medal–winning works
Holt, Rinehart and Winston books